Bearlake may refer to:
 an Intel mainboard chipset series
 a language from Northwestern Canada
 a subarctic tribe

See also 
 Bear Lake (disambiguation)